Cimarron (and similar spellings) may refer to:

Film and television
 Cimarron (1931 film), an Academy Award-winning film starring Richard Dix
 Cimarron (1960 film), a western film starring Glenn Ford directed by Anthony Mann
 Cimarrón (telenovela), a Venezuelan telenovela
 El Cimarrón (film), a Puerto Rican film released in 2007
 Cimarron City (TV series), a 1958-1959 U.S. western television series set in Oklahoma, starring George Montgomery
 The Cimarron Kid, a 1952 western film starring Audie Murphy, directed by Budd Boetticher
 Cimarron Strip (1967–68), a U.S. western television series
 Rose of Cimarron (film), a 1952 Western film starring Mala Powers
 Spirit: Stallion of the Cimarron, a 2002 film produced by DreamWorks Animation

Music
 El Cimarrón (Henze), a 1970 musical work by Hans Werner Henze
 Cimarron (album), a 1981 album by Emmylou Harris
 "Cimarron", a 1995 song by alternative rock band Come
 Rose of Cimarron (album), a 1976 album and single by country rock band Poco

Places in the United States

Populated places 
 Cimarron, Colorado, an unincorporated community
 Cimarron Hills, Colorado, a census-designated place
 Cimarron, Kansas, a city
 Cimarron, New Mexico, a village
 Cimarron City, Oklahoma, a town
 Cimarron County, Oklahoma, a county
 Cimarron, Texas, an unincorporated community
 Cimarron Township (disambiguation)

Other geographical places 
 Cimarron Territory, a former name for the Oklahoma Panhandle
 Cimarron Lake, a reservoir in Mohave County, Arizona
 Cimarron Ridge, a ridge in Colorado
 Cimarron Range in the Sangre de Cristo Mountains in New Mexico
 Cimarron National Grassland, in southwest Kansas
 Cimarron River (disambiguation)
 Cimarron Territory, a provisional territory in Oklahoma's panhandle
 Cimarron Turnpike, a highway which runs between Tulsa and Stillwater, Oklahoma
 Cimarron Cutoff, part of the Santa Fe Trail

Other uses
 Cimarrón (drink), or maté, a South American beverage
 Cimarrones, descendants of Africans in the Americas who formed settlements away from slavery
 Cimarron people (Panama)
 Cimarron (novel), a 1929 novel by Edna Ferber
 USS Cimarron, US Navy ships
 Cadillac Cimarron, an American automobile
 Cimarrón Uruguayo, a breed of dog
 Cimarron Hydroelectric Power Project, a projected dam in El Salvador